Ellingtonia '56 is an album recorded by American jazz saxophonist Johnny Hodges featuring performances with members of the Duke Ellington Orchestra recorded in 1956 and released on the Norgran label.

Reception

The Allmusic site awarded the album 3 stars.

Track listing
All compositions by Johnny Hodges, except as indicated.
 "Hi 'Ya" (Johnny Hodges, Billy Strayhorn) - 3:10
 "Snibor" (Strayhorn) - 7:16
 "Texas Blues" - 11:47
 "I'm Gonna Sit Right Down and Write Myself a Letter" (Fred E. Ahlert, Joe Young) - 3:29
 "Duke's Jam" (Edith Cue Hodges) - 6:25
 "Night Walk" (Cat Anderson) - 3:13
 "The Happy One" (Anderson) - 2:52
 "You Got It Coming" - 6:04

Personnel
Johnny Hodges - alto saxophone
Cat Anderson (tracks 5-8), Willie Cook (tracks 5-8), Ray Nance, Clark Terry (tracks 5-8) - trumpet
Lawrence Brown (tracks 1-4), Quentin Jackson (tracks 5-8), John Sanders (tracks 5-8), Britt Woodman (tracks 5-8) - trombone
Jimmy Hamilton - clarinet, tenor saxophone
Russell Procope - alto saxophone (tracks 5-8)
Paul Gonsalves - tenor saxophone (tracks 5-8)
Harry Carney - baritone saxophone
Billy Strayhorn - piano
Jimmy Woode - bass
Sam Woodyard - drums

References

1956 albums
Johnny Hodges albums
Verve Records albums
Albums produced by Norman Granz